Nupserha kenyensis is a species of beetle in the family Cerambycidae. It was described by Stephan von Breuning in 1958.

Subspecies
 Nupserha kenyensis kenyensis Breuning, 1958
 Nupserha kenyensis ethiopica Breuning, 1977

References

kenyensis
Beetles described in 1958